The 2022–23 Japan Figure Skating Championships were held in Kadoma, Osaka on December 21–25, 2022. It was the 91st edition of the event. Medals were awarded in the disciplines of men's singles, women's singles, pairs, and ice dance. The results were part of the Japanese selection criteria for the 2023 Four Continents Championships and the 2023 World Championships.

Qualifying 
Competitors either qualified at regional and sectional competitions, held from September to November 2022, or earned a bye.

Medal summary

Senior

Junior

Novice

Entries 
A list of preliminary entries was published on December 6, 2022. Names with an asterisk (*) denote junior skaters.

Junior 
The top eight finishers at the Japan Junior Championships in men's and women's singles and one pair team were added to the Japan Championships.

Changes to preliminary entries

Results

Men

Women

Pairs

Ice dance

Japan Junior Figure Skating Championships 
The 2022–23 Japan Junior Figure Skating Championships were held in Hitachinaka, Ibaraki from November 25–27, 2022. The national champions in men's and women's singles earned automatic berths on the 2023 World Junior Championships team. Top finishers in men's and women's singles were invited to compete at the senior Japan Championships in December.

Entries 

A list of preliminary entries was published on November 15, 2022. Names with an asterisk (*) denote novice skaters.

Novice 
Top finishers at the Japan Novice Championships in men's and women's singles were added to the Japan Junior Championships.

Results

Junior men

Junior women

Junior pairs

Junior ice dance

International team selections

Winter University Games 
The 2023 Winter University Games was held in Lake Placid, United States from January 13–16, 2023.

Four Continents Championships 
The 2023 Four Continents Championships will be held in Colorado Springs, United States from February 7–12, 2023.

World Junior Championships 
Commonly referred to as "Junior Worlds", the 2023 World Junior Championships will be held in Calgary, Canada from February 27 – March 5, 2023.

World Championships 
The 2023 World Championships will be held in Saitama, Japan from March 20–26, 2023.

References 

Japan Figure Skating Championships
Japan Championships
Figure Skating Championships